Tarni White (born 31 January 2001) is an Australian rules footballer who plays for Collingwood in the AFL Women's (AFLW). She has previosly played for St Kilda. It was revealed White had signed on with St Kilda for two more seasons on 30 June 2021.

References

External links

 

Living people
2001 births
St Kilda Football Club (AFLW) players
Australian rules footballers from Queensland
Sportswomen from Queensland